Moringa ovalifolia is a succulent flowering tree of the family Moringaceae native to Namibia and southwestern Angola.

It is a succulent-stemmed tree found in desert and semi-desert areas. The plant grows vertically, and can reach  in height. It is deciduous and has a main branch up to 1 meter in diameter.

German botanists Kurt Dinter and Alwin Berger described the species in 1914.

Moringa ovalifolia has been classified in a section Donaldsoniana within the genus, however genetic analysis shows that this group is not a natural group (paraphyletic).

Moringa ovalifolia occurs on rocky escarpment passes leading to the Namib Desert. This species is the dominant component of the woodland known as the Fairy Tale Forest in Etosha National Park.

Gallery

References

ovalifolia
Endemic flora of Angola
Endemic flora of Namibia
Trees of Africa
Drought-tolerant trees
Plants described in 1914
Taxa named by Alwin Berger
Taxa named by Kurt Dinter